"Book of Days" is a song by Irish musician Enya. The original version, included on her 1991 album Shepherd Moons, is sung in Irish Gaelic. The subsequent 1992 single version is bilingual, with new English lyrics; this version was recorded for Ron Howard's film Far and Away, and scenes from the film feature in the video. The bilingual English-Irish version replaced the original pure Gaelic version on subsequent pressings of Shepherd Moons from mid-1992 onwards, making the original recording relatively rare.

Despite being nominated for a Razzie, "Book of Days" became Enya's second top-ten single on the UK Singles Chart, peaking at number 10, and reached number 12 on the Irish Singles Chart. It was used as a temp track during the editing of James Cameron's film Titanic, for the scene eventually accompanied by the musical cue called "Take Her To Sea, Mr. Murdoch" on the finished soundtrack by James Horner.

Critical reception
Ned Raggett from AllMusic stated that the singer's "trademark understated drama [are] in full flow" on the "wonderful" song. Gavin Report wrote, "This is a melodic and harmonic masterpiece with all the elements to make it a classic." Music & Media said, "Taken from the motion picture Far and Away, this is the sung version of the original ethereal Clannad instrumental." Music Week commented, that Enya's "latest sonic soundscape, Book Of Days, is typically mellifluous. Multi-textured yet as light as air".

Track listings

Charts

In popular culture
The song was used in a Toyota advertising campaign for the Carina E in the UK in the early 1990s. It was also used as background music during the Medal Ceremonies at the 2009 IAAF World Championships in Athletics in Berlin and Tuck Everlasting trailer. Additionally, the Gaelic version of "Book of Days" was used as the title sequence of the Japanese film Calmi Cuori Appassionati (2001).  It was also used in the “Endgame” episode of Robot Chicken, when Fabio takes the nerd to infinity and beyond and was also used in the Billy Eliott and Marvin's Room trailers.

References

External links
 

Enya songs
1991 songs
1992 singles
Songs with lyrics by Roma Ryan
Songs with music by Enya
Warner Music Group singles